The Estadio Municipal Jocay is a multi-use stadium in Manta, Ecuador.  It is currently used mostly for football matches and is the home stadium of Delfín S.C. of the Serie A de Ecuador and Manta F.C. of the Serie B de Ecuador.  The stadium holds 20,000 spectators and opened on 14 January 1962. It is the most westerly stadium in South America.

References

Jocay
Manta, Ecuador
Buildings and structures in Manabí Province